The Airport Flyover is a road bridge over the Southern Cross Way in Brisbane, Queensland, Australia. The Airport Flyover links the Airport Link toll road with Airport Drive providing direct access to Brisbane Airport terminals. The east bound lanes were opened in early November 2010, more than a year earlier than originally planned. The westbound lanes were opened on 28 February 2011.

Construction began in April 2009. The total cost for the roundabout upgrade cost A$327 million and it was designed and built by a Thiess/John Holland Group joint venture. 10 minutes of travel time is expected to be saved by construction of the bridge.

The Airport Flyover with an intersection below, replaced the Airport Roundabout which was described as the worst congestion black spot in the South East Queensland. Up to 17 million vehicles crossed the intersection every year.

See also

Airport Link, Brisbane

References

External links
Brisconnections - Airport Roundabout Upgrade
 Project description and plans
Brisbane Airport Corporation Monthly Traffic Update, January 2011

Bridges in Brisbane
Road bridges in Queensland
Bridges completed in 2011
Cantilever bridges
Concrete bridges in Australia
Road interchanges in Australia